The 1999 Baylor Bears football team (variously "Baylor", "BU", or the "Bears") represented Baylor University in the 1999 NCAA Division I-A football season. They were represented in the Big 12 Conference in the South Division. They played their home games at Floyd Casey Stadium in Waco, Texas. They were coached by head coach Kevin Steele.

Schedule

References

Baylor
Baylor Bears football seasons
Baylor Bears football